The Petya class was the NATO reporting name for a class of light frigates designed in the 1950s and built for the Soviet Navy in the 1960s. The Soviet designation was "Storozhevoi Korabl`" (Сторожевой Корабль - Sentry Ship) Project 159.

Design

They were the first gas turbine-powered ships in the Soviet Navy. The role of these ships was anti-submarine warfare in shallow waters and they were similar to the s. The specification (TTZ in Russian) was issued in 1955 and design approved in 1956. A three shaft machinery layout was chosen with the central shaft powered by diesel engines for economical cruising and the two wing shafts powered by gas turbines for speed. Gun armament was two twin AK-726  gun turrets in "A" and "Y" positions which were controlled by a single radar director. Anti-submarine armament consisted of four RBU-6000 anti-submarine rocket launchers and a launcher for  anti-submarine torpedoes. Some of the ships designed for export replaced the 406 mm torpedo tubes with anti-shipping  torpedo tubes. A comprehensive sonar suite including VDS was fitted.

Ships

A total of 54 ships were built in two shipyards: the Kaliningrad Yantar shipyard built 22 ships including exports and Khabarovsk yard built 32 ships including exports. All Soviet ships were decommissioned in 1989-1992 but some are still in service with export customers.

Export sales
  Azerbaijani Navy - 1 ship
  Egyptian Navy - 4 ships acquired between 1965 and 1971, 1 sunk in combat in 1973, 1 still in service
  Ethiopian Navy - 4 ships - sold for scrap in Djibouti following the independence of Eritrea
  Indian Navy - 11 ships designated s (all decommissioned). Classified as corvette due to smaller size and role of the ships.
  Syrian Arab Navy - 2 ships were in service, in derelict condition at Tartus port. Probably retired in 2017 or 2018. 1 decommissioned Syrian frigate sunk by Russian air force (Probably by SU-34 with KH-35 air-launched missile) as a training target on 15 April 2018 off the coast of Syria.
 Ukrainian Navy - 1 ship. The pro-Ukrainian crew of a frigate SKR-112 made an independent transition from the Black Sea Fleet controlled by Moscow on July 21, 1992. The ship was in the Ukraine's service until it was decommissioned in 1993.
 Vietnam People's Navy - 5 ships (still in service), being modernized with rebuilt stealthy superstructure and new combat suites.

See also
 List of ships of the Soviet Navy
 List of ships of Russia by project number

References

 Conway's All the World's Fighting Ships 1947-1995

External links

 page from FAS
 Page in Russian
  Russian Petya Class Frigates - Complete Ship List

 
Frigate classes
Ships of the Soviet Navy